Burlingame Reservoir is a body of water in Glocester, Providence County, Rhode Island, United States, and is part of the Durfee Hill Management Area.

References

 Durfee Hill Management Area

Glocester, Rhode Island
Reservoirs in Rhode Island
Lakes of Providence County, Rhode Island
Buildings and structures in Providence County, Rhode Island
Protected areas of Providence County, Rhode Island